Agostinho Manuel Almeida Caetano (born 9 December 1966) is a Portuguese retired footballer who played as a forward.

Club career
Caetano was born in Penafiel, Porto District. Over nine seasons, he amassed Primeira Liga totals of 226 games and 21 goals, mainly with F.C. Tirsense (four years). In 1993–94, he scored a career-best 11 goals in 32 matches with precisely his main club, as the campaign ended in promotion from the second division.

Caetano retired in 1997 at the age of 30, after one season with S.C. Espinho in the top tier.

International career
Whilst a Tirsense player, Caetano won two caps for Portugal in late January 1995, during the SkyDome Cup. His first arrived on the 26th, as he played 62 minutes in a 1–1 draw against hosts Canada.

Personal life
Caetano's son, Rui, was also a footballer and a forward. He played mostly for F.C. Paços de Ferreira.

Caetano retired early to open a real estate company, and his son also quit professional football prematurely to concentrate on business.

References

External links

1966 births
Living people
People from Penafiel
Sportspeople from Porto District
Portuguese footballers
Association football forwards
Primeira Liga players
Liga Portugal 2 players
F.C. Penafiel players
FC Porto players
F.C. Tirsense players
S.C. Espinho players
Portugal international footballers